Cryptanaerobacter phenolicus is a gram-positive anaerobic bacterial species in the genus Cryptanaerobacter.

The genus Cryptanaerobacter contains a single species, namely C. phenolicus (Type species of the genus).; New Latin noun phenol -olis, phenol; Latin masculine gender suff. -icus, suffix used in adjectives with the sense of belonging to; New Latin masculine gender adjective phenolicus, belonging to phenol.)

References

External links
Type strain of Cryptanaerobacter phenolicus at BacDive -  the Bacterial Diversity Metadatabase

Peptococcaceae
Bacteria described in 2005